Major groups in the Aleutian Islands are listed from east to west, and islands within each group are listed alphabetically.  The Aleut names are given in parentheses.

Fox Islands
Adugak Island - rookery for endangered Steller sea lion
Aiktak Island (Ugangax)
Akun Island (Akungan)
Akutan Island (Akutanax̂) - Mount Akutan volcano, city of Akutan (population 713 in 2000)
Amak Island (Amax)
Amaknak Island (Amaxnax̂) - population was 2,524 in 2000
Amukta Island (Amuux̂tax̂)
Ananiuliak Island
Avatanak Island (Agutanax̂)
Baby Islands
Bird Island (Kitnamax)
Bogoslof Island (Aĝasaaĝux̂) - sanctuary for sea lions and nesting marine birds
Breadloaf Island (Taanĝiinax̂)
Buck Island (Ukdax̂sxix)
Caton Island (Qagan Unimgix̂)
Chagulak Island (Chugssĝinax̂)

Deer Island (Animin)
Derbin Island
Dushkot Island (Duxsxan)
Egg Island (Ugalĝa)
Emerald Island
Expedition Island (Guchiganang)
Fire Island - federally protected bird sanctuary
Gargoyle Island
Gull Island
Hog Island (Uknadax)
Kaligagan Island (Qisxagan)
Kigul Island (Kiigalux̂)
Krenitzin Islands (group of islands) - All part of the Alaska Maritime National Wildlife Refuge
Kudiakof Island
Ogangen Island
Ogchul Island (Uxchalux̂)
Pancake Rock (Kaduuĝix̂ Tanax̂)
Peter Island
Poa Island (Saduuĝinax̂)
Pustoi Island (Taĝilgadax)
Rootok Island (Aayux̂tax̂)
Round Island (Imlichin)
Samalga Island (Samalĝa)
Sanak Island (Sanaĝax)
Sedanka Island (Sidaanax̂)
Sushilnoi Island (Tanĝimax)
Tangik Island (Tan'gax̂)
Tanginak Island
Tigalda Island (Qigalĝan)
Ugamak Island (Ugangax̂)
Umnak Island (Unmax)
Unalaska Island (Nawan-Alaxsxa)
Unalga Island (Unalĝa)
Unimak Island (Unimax)
Vsevidof Island (Uyagax̂)
Wislow Island

Islands of Four Mountains (Uniiĝun)
Amukta Island (Amuux̂tax̂)
Chagulak Island (Chugaaĝinax̂)
Chuginadak Island (Tanax̂ Angunax̂)
Carlisle Island (Kigalĝa)
Herbert Island (Chiĝulax)
Kagamil Island (Qagaamila)
Uliaga Island (Ulaĝa)
Yunaska Island (Yunax̂sxa)

Andreanof Islands (Niiĝuĝin tanangis)
Adak Island (Adaax)
Agligadak Island (Aĝligadax)
Amatigis Islands
Amatignak Island (Amatignax̂)
Amlia Island (Amlax)
Anagaksik Island (Anagaxsax̂)
Argonne Island
Asuksak Island (Hasux̂sax̂)
Atka Island (Atx̂ax̂)
Aziak Island (Haazax)
Barbara Island
Black Island
Bobrof Island (Walĝa)
Bolshoi Island (Tanax̂ Angunax̂)
Box Island
Castle Island
Chaika Rock (Hasax̂sax̂)
Channel Island
Chisak Island (Hatmax)
Chugul Island (Chiĝulax̂)
Cone Island
Cormorant Island
Crone Island
Delarof Islands (Naahmiĝun tanangis)
Dora Island
Eddy Island (Ugidaagamax)
Egg Island (Ugalĝa)
Elf Island
Fenimore Rock (Taxchisax̂)
Gareloi Island (Anangusix̂)
Gramp Rock
Great Sitkin Island (Stitxinax̂̂)
Green Island (Hmiikaayaĝus)
Igitkin Island (Igitxix̂)
Ikiginak Island (Ikiiĝinax̂)
Ilak Island (Iilax̂)
Ina Island
Kagalaska Island (Qigalaxsix̂)
Kanaga Island (Kanaga)
Kanu Island (Yunax̂)
Kasatochi Island (Qanan-tanax)
Kavalga Island (Qawalĝa)
Koniuji Island (Tanĝimax)
Little Tanaga Island (Tanagax̂)
North Island (Chihngax̂)
Ogliuga Island (Aglaga)
Oglodak Island (Ungluudâ)
Plum Island
Ringgold Island (Tanam Aduu)
Sadatanek Island (Sadan-tanax̂)
Sagchudak Island (Saĝuugax̂)
Sagigik Island (Amlagim Saĝuugaa)
Salt Island (Uladax)
Sea Parrot Island
Seguam Island (Saĝuugamax)
Silak Island (Silax̂)
Skagul Island (Sxaĝulax̂)
South Island
Staten Island (Iluuĝix̂ Tanax̂)
Tag Islands (Tagachaluĝis)
Tagadak Island (Tanadax)
Tagalak Island (Tagalax̂)
Tanadak Island (Tanaadax̂)
Tanaga Island (Tanax̂ax)
Tanaklek Island (Tanaqlax̂)
The Signals
The Three Sisters
Tidgituk Island (Aakutanas)
Ugidak Island (Qagan-tanax̂)
Ulak Island (Uulax)
Umak Island (Uhmax̂)
Unalga Island (Unalĝa)
Uyak Island (Uuyax)
Whip Island

Rat Islands (Qax̂um tanangis)
Amchitka Island (Amchixtax̂) - site of underground nuclear weapons tests
Bird Rock
Davidof Island (Qanan-tanax)
Khvostof Island (Atanax̂)
Kiska Island (Qisxa)
Little Kiska Island (Kangxhix̂)
Little Sitkin Island (Sitignax̂)
Pyramid Island
Rat Island (Hawadax)
Segula Island (Chiĝulax̂)
Semisopochnoi Island (Unyax)
Tanadak Island (Tanaadax̂)

Buldir Island (Idmaax)
Buldir Island (Idmaax)

Near Islands (Sasignan Tanangin)
Agattu Island (Angatux̂)
Alaid Island (Igingiinax̂)
Attu Island (Atan)
Cooper Islands
Gibson Islands
Hammerhead Island
Hodikof Island
Kennon Island
Kohl Island
Loaf Island
Lotus Island
Nizki Island (Avayax̂)
Peaked Island
Savage Island
Semichi Islands (Samiyan)
Shemya Island (Samiyax̂)

Commander Islands (Russia)
Bering Island
Medny Island

References
Bergsland, K. Aleut Dictionary, Fairbanks: Alaska Native Language Center, 1994
Orth, Donald J.  1971.  Dictionary of Alaskan place names.  U.S. Geological Survey Professional Paper 567, 1083 pp.

Aleutian
Aleutian Islands
Aleutian Islands
Aleutian